United Africa Feeder Line (UAFL) is a shipping company founded in 2000 as a regional feeder service in Africa. Head office of UAFL is in Mauritius. UAFL is serving East-Africa, Southern Africa and the Indian Ocean Islands out of Europe, Asia and the Middle East. 
UAFL is part of the German shipping group Deutsche Afrika-Linien (DAL) Group, based in Hamburg. 

Directors of UAFL are Michael McKeown and Dr. Dag-Sven Dieckmann.

External links
United Africa Feeder Line (UAFL) official site

Shipping companies of Mauritius